Straw feminism is a form of straw man argument used by antifeminists in which a distorted or fabricated version of feminism is used in an attempt to mock or dismiss feminist arguments. A straw feminist then is a fabricated character that often uses oversimplifications, misrepresentations and stereotypes in order to discredit feminism as a whole.
For example, straw feminists are often depicted as promoting incendiary beliefs such as "all men are evil".
Media researcher Michele White argues that straw feminism creates a burden for feminists who are constantly expected to refute the straw-feminist position, with the intent of making feminism unpalatable to potential supporters.

See also 
 Feminazi
 Men's rights
 Misandry
 Sexism

References 

Opposition to feminism
Feminist terminology
Fallacies